In algebraic geometry, a relative cycle is a type of algebraic cycle on a scheme. In particular, let  be a scheme of finite type over a Noetherian scheme , so that .

The notion was introduced by Andrei Suslin and Vladimir Voevodsky in 2000; the authors were motivated to overcome some of the deficiencies of sheaves with transfers.

References 

Appendix 1A of 

Algebraic geometry